Emanuel Alexander Zagert (born 18 September 1995) is an Argentine professional footballer who plays as a forward for Acassuso.

Career
Zagert began his career with Gimnasia y Esgrima of the Argentine Primera División. In 2016, Zagert joined Primera B Nacional side Estudiantes on loan. He made his first appearance on 29 January 2016 during a 2–1 win over Juventud Unida Universitario, coming on as a substitute with Estudiantes a goal down. He returned to Gimnasia y Esgrima in July 2016. A year later, on 19 July 2017, Zagert was loaned to Primera B Metropolitana team Villa San Carlos. He made his debut on 26 September in a defeat to San Miguel, before scoring back-to-back in February 2018 against Tristán Suárez and Barracas Central.

San Telmo completed the signing of Zagert in July 2019. He scored four times in his first nine fixtures.

Career statistics
.

References

External links

1995 births
Living people
People from Resistencia, Chaco
Argentine footballers
Association football forwards
Argentine Primera División players
Primera Nacional players
Primera B Metropolitana players
Club de Gimnasia y Esgrima La Plata footballers
Club Sportivo Estudiantes players
Club Atlético Villa San Carlos footballers
San Telmo footballers
Club Comunicaciones footballers
Deportivo Armenio footballers
Club Atlético Acassuso footballers
Sportspeople from Chaco Province